Passport to Adventure is the name of:

 Passport to Adventure (TV series) (1965-1967), a Canadian television series
 an alternate title for the film Passport to Destiny (1944)